Meldrum Academy is a secondary school run by Aberdeenshire Council in Oldmeldrum, Aberdeenshire, Scotland.

It was established in 2002 with S1 and S2 pupils only. S2 pupils came from nearby Ellon and Inverurie Academy.  Princess Anne opened the building in 2002 and Andrew Sutherland was the first head teacher. The acting head teacher is Ian Jackson. Houses are Bruce, Glennie, Slessor, Telford and Wallace. The school also has a library that is open to the public and to the pupils also. 

School Houses:
Wallace- Guidance teacher is Mrs Walker, house colour Red, house animal wolf. 
Telford- Guidance teacher is Mrs Blevins, house colour orange, house animal tiger. 
Slessor- Guidance teacher is Mrs Fitzgerald, house colour yellow, house animal shark. 
Glennie- Guidance teacher is Mrs MacLeod, house colour green, house animal gator. 
Bruce- Guidance teacher is Mrs Allan, house colour blue, house animal bear.

Former pupil James Lindsay aka Jim Lin is a renowned folk musician and composer.
https://jameslindsaymusic.bandcamp.com/album/torus

References

External links
Official website

Secondary schools in Aberdeenshire
2002 establishments in Scotland
Educational institutions established in 2002